Barton is a civil parish in Cheshire West and Chester, England. It contains nine buildings that are recorded in the National Heritage List for England as designated listed buildings, all of which are at Grade II. This grade is the lowest of the three gradings given to listed buildings and is applied to "buildings of national importance and special interest". Other than the settlement of Barton, the parish is rural. Most of the listed buildings are domestic or related to farming, apart from a public house, the stocks, and a well.

See also
Listed buildings in Carden
Listed buildings in Clutton
Listed buildings in Coddington
Listed buildings in Farndon
Listed buildings in Stretton

References

Listed buildings in Cheshire West and Chester
Lists of listed buildings in Cheshire